Martha Ann "Mattie" Rogers (born August 23, 1995) is an American Olympic weightlifter. She is a four-time silver medalist at the World Weightlifting Championships. She holds the United States record in the snatch, clean & jerk, and total. She competed for the United States at the 2020 Summer Olympics in the 87 kg category.

Early life
Rogers was born August 23, 1995, in Apopka, Florida. Before weightlifting, Rogers competed in cheerleading and gymnastics. She began training in CrossFit when she was 17 years old. After one year of training, she competed in her first weightlifting meet.

Weightlifting career
In 2014, Rogers made her International Weightlifting Federation debut at the 2014 IWF Pan-American Junior Championships. She made her senior-level debut a year later at the 2015 World Championships where she finished 15th overall with a total of 226 kg. She competed the next year at the 2015 World Weightlifting Championships.

In 2016, Rogers narrowly missed qualifying for the 2016 Summer Olympics. She was awarded best overall lifter at the 2016 National Championships & Olympic Trials, but ultimately did not meet the qualification criteria set by the IWF.

In 2021, she won the silver medal in the women's 76 kg event at the World Weightlifting Championships held in Tashkent, Uzbekistan.

She won the gold medal in the women's 76 kg event at the 2022 Pan American Weightlifting Championships held in Bogotá, Colombia. She also won the gold medals in the Snatch and Clean & Jerk events in this competition. Later in the year, at the 2022 World Weightlifting Championships also held in Bogota, she again won silvers in the women's 76 kg as well the Snatch and Clean & Jerk, making her the only American weightlifter to win medals at five consecutive World Championships.

Major results

International events

National events

References

External links
 
Weightlifter Mattie Rogers Fact Checks Her Wikipedia Page at NBC New York

1995 births
Living people
American female weightlifters
People from Apopka, Florida
World Weightlifting Championships medalists
Pan American Weightlifting Championships medalists
Weightlifters at the 2020 Summer Olympics
Olympic weightlifters of the United States
21st-century American women